HMS Colchester was a 50-gun fourth-rate ship of the line of the Royal Navy, built by Joseph Allin the elder at Deptford Dockyard and launched on 13 February 1707.

She underwent a rebuild at Chatham according to the 1719 Establishment, and was relaunched on 26 October 1721. Colchester served until 1742, when she was broken up.

Notes

References

 Lavery, Brian (2003) The Ship of the Line - Volume 1: The development of the battlefleet 1650-1850. Conway Maritime Press. .

Ships of the line of the Royal Navy
1700s ships